Heybeliada, or Heybeli Ada, is the second largest of the Prince' Islands in the Sea of Marmara, near Istanbull, Turkey. It is officially a neighbourhood of the Adalar district of Istanbul. Its name, meaning 'with a saddlebag' in Turkish, in supposed reference to the valley between two hills. 

The island was known as Halki, Halkitis and Demonesos (Greek: Δημόνησος) in antiquity, the first two toponyms deriving from the Greek word halkos, meaning copper. The island was famous for its copper and copper ores in antiquity.

In winter the island's population is only about 5,500, but in summer, the owners of summer houses return and the population swells to approximately 30,000. 

Launched in 2008, TCG Heybeliada, used by the Turkish Navy is named after the island.

Until 2020, the only vehicles permitted on the island were ambulances, fire tenders, police cars etc; the only official form of transport was by horse-drawn phaeton. However, as tourism steadily increased animal-rights activists became increasingly concerned about the horses' welfare and so the phaetons were withdrawn in favour of electric vehicles.

The island is served by Şehir Hatları ferries from Kabataş and Eminönü on the European side of İstanbul and Kadıköy and Bostanci on the Asian side.

Geography 
Heybeli only covers 2.35 sqm but has four hills - Ümit Tepesi (Hope Hill, 85m/278ft), Değirmen Tepesi (Mill Hill, 136m/446ft), Köy Tepesi (Village Hill, 128m/420ft) and Baltıcıoğlu Tepes (Woodcutter's Son Hill, 98m/322ft).

Attractions 
The island's main attractions in summer are small-scale open-air concerts and a swimming and fitness club beside the sea. The annual Independence Day march on 29 October is celebrated by the  resident naval band touring the island.

A large Naval High School, originally founded in 1773, overlooks the jetty. In its grounds is Kamariotissa, the only remaining Byzantine church on the island, and, more importantly, the last church to be built before the conquest of Constantinople. It is not open to the public. Also in the grounds is the grave of Edward Barton, the second English Ambassador sent to Constantinople by Elizabeth I of England, who spent his last days on Heybeli to escape an outbreak of plague raging through the city in 1598. His gravestone was later relocated to the British War Graves Cemetery in the Haydarpaşa quarter of Üsküdar.

The monastery of Hagios Georgios tou Kremnou (St George on the Cliff) was founded in the late 16th century and was often used as a haven for the local Greek population when plague hit the mainland. Another monastery, built in the late 19th century and dedicated to Hagios Spyridon, is in ruins. 

Mavromatakis Köşkü, a house belonging to İsmet İnönü, the second President of Turkey who was a regular visitor to the island, is sometimes open as a museum.

In the centre of Halki Town is the Greek Orthodox church of Hagios Nikoloas (St Nicholas), built in 1857 on the site of an older Byzantine church. It contains a spring (ayazma) dedicated to Hagia Paraskevi. Nearby are the Ben Yazkor synagogue and Heybeliada Cami, their proximity recalling more cosmopolitan times. 

Like Büyükada, Heybeliada has many fine 19th-century mansions especially on Lozan Zeferi and Refah Şehitler Streets. They are all listed in John Freely's book on the islands.Published in 2006 Mary Ann Whitten's book, An Island in Istanbul: At Home on Heybeliada, recounts the story of an American couple who bought one of the old houses to live in.

The Halki Seminary 
On Ümit Tepesi (Hope Hill) in the centre of the island is the Greek Orthodox monastery of Hagia Triada ("Monastery of the Holy Trinity"). Its origins are shrouded in mystery but  it was restored by patriarch Photios I of Constantinople who was buried there in the 9th century. The monastery was destroyed in 1453 but rebuilt and given an extensive library in 1550. It burned down again in 1821, and was finally reconstructed by patriarch Germanus IV of Constantinople  in 1844 when it became home to the Halki Theological Seminary of the Ecumenical Patriarchate of Constantinople, the main Greek Orthodox seminary in Turkey. In 1894 it was again destroyed, this time by an earthquake, only to be rebuilt two years later by Perikles Photiades.

The Seminary has had a very chequered history and in 1971, parts of Turkey's Private University Law were ruled unconstitutional by the Constitutional Court, forcing all private institutions of higher education to become parts of state universities or close down. Halki's Board of Trustees refused to let it become part of the University of Istanbul so the seminary was shuttered. Its closure made it impossible to train any more Greek Orthodox clergy within Turkey and has proved very controversial, with President Erdoğan suggesting in 2021 that it might be reopened independently if Greece improved conditions for the Turkish Muslim population of Thrace.

Famous Residents of Heybeliada 

 İsmet Inönü, second president of Turkey
 Edward Barton, second ambassador of Queen Elizabeth I to Constantinople
 Hüseyin Rahmi Gürpınar, Turkish novelist and politician
 Nicodemus I, patriarch of Jerusalem
 Ahmet Rasım, Turkish writer and historian

External links 
Heybeliada (Prince island) / istanbul / Turkey, published in youtube.com on Jan 21, 2014, by Aydın Şevik.
A tour of the island photos, Greek title and legends, published in youtube.com on Apr 10, 2015 by Sokratis Bahlas.

Heybeliada  at Istanbul Metropolitan Municipality website

References

Further reading 
  - Page 2 - Page 3

Islands of the Sea of Marmara
Islands of Turkey
Fishing communities in Turkey
Neighbourhoods of Adalar, Istanbul
Islands of Istanbul Province